Comes from the Heart is the second release by American hardcore punk band Stick to Your Guns.

The album peaked at #33 on Billboard'''s Heatseekers chart.

Critical reception
AllMusic wrote that the album "never achieves greatness, but considering how many embarrassingly sloppy screamo releases there have been in the 21st century, competent at least counts for something." Exclaim!'' wrote that the album pales in comparison to the band's live show.

Track listing

Personnel 
 Jesse Barnett – lead vocals, guitars
 Casey Lagos – drums, percussion, guitars, bass, programming, vocals on "Part of Me" and "Tonight's Entertainment"
 Produced by Zeuss

References

2008 albums
Stick to Your Guns (band) albums
Sumerian Records albums